"Fast Boy/Liquid Lips" was a double-A-side single, released by The Bluetones from their fourth album, 2003's Luxembourg. Both title tracks were also included on the band's 2006 compilation A Rough Outline: The Singles & B-Sides 95 - 03. It reached number 25 on the UK Singles Chart.

Track listing
CD1
"Fast Boy"
"Liquid Lips"
"Beat on the Brat"

CD2
"Fast Boy"
"Liquid Lips"
"Move Closer"

7" 
"Fast Boy"
"Liquid Lips"

The Bluetones songs
2003 singles
2003 songs
Songs written by Eds Chesters
Songs written by Adam Devlin
Songs written by Mark Morriss
Songs written by Scott Morriss